Franco Franchi (1 September 1923 – 29 October 2018) was an Italian racing cyclist. He won stage 5 of the 1950 Giro d'Italia. Franchi died on 29 October 2018 at the age of 95.

References

External links
 

1923 births
2018 deaths
Italian male cyclists
Italian Giro d'Italia stage winners
Sportspeople from the Province of Teramo
Cyclists from Abruzzo